Homona salaconis is a species of moth of the family Tortricidae first described by Edward Meyrick in 1912. It is found in the Philippines, Seram, Sumatra, Sulawesi and Dutch New Guinea. The habitat consists of cultivated areas and lowland forests.

The larvae feed on Elaeis guineensis, Theobroma cacao and Solanum species.

References

Moths described in 1912
Homona (moth)